Mohamouda Ahmed Gaas is an Ethiopian politician and a member of the Ethiopian ruling party. He was a State (Vice) Minister of the Ethiopian Ministry of Culture and Tourism up until October 2010, when he was dismissed over poor performance in a cabinet reshuffle.

Mohamouda Ahmed Gaas founded the Afar Revolutionary Democratic Unity Union (ARDUU) in 1991. ARDUU later became a part of the Afar Revolutionary Democratic Unity Front (ARDUF). Mohamooda Gaas was elected as the Secretary General of ARDUF in 1995, but refused the post, leaving it to his deputy Muhyadin Mafatah.

In 1995, Gaas defected from the ARDUF and joined the ruling party. Possibly as a reward, he was given a post in the Government, and in 2006 was promoted to the position of a vice or state minister reporting to the Ethiopian Minister of Culture and Tourism.

Gaas is a Muslim and hails from the AFAR region of Ethiopia. He is married with 3 children and speaks 4 different languages.

Millennium pageant controversy
The Ministry of Culture and Tourism, which is responsible for developing and promoting tourism in Ethiopia,  has been embroiled in a major controversy surrounding a beauty pageant in celebration of the Ethiopian Millennium in 2007. Allegedly Mohamouda Ahmed Gaas and officials from the ministry obtained promotional services from a UK based company for the Ethiopian Millennium but after the event took place refused to pay. Following claims of failure to pay major bills, in December 2009  the company commenced formal legal action in the British courts, seeking a total payment of US$1,022,810.52, comprising US$488.500.00 principal debt and US$543,310.52 interest and late fees.

References

Year of birth missing (living people)
Living people
Afar Revolutionary Democratic Unity Front politicians
Government ministers of Ethiopia
Ethiopian Muslims
Ethiopian People's Revolutionary Democratic Front politicians
21st-century Ethiopian politicians